Entelopes wallacei is a species of beetle in the family Cerambycidae. It was described by Francis Polkinghorne Pascoe in 1856. It can be found in Borneo.

References

Saperdini
Beetles described in 1856